Mouloud Noura (born 30 December 1982) is an Algerian Paralympic judoka. He represented Algeria at the 2008 Summer Paralympics, at the 2012 Summer Paralympics and at the 2016 Summer Paralympics. He won two medals: the gold medal in the men's 60 kg event in 2008 and one of the bronze medals in the men's 60 kg event in 2012.

References

External links 

 

1982 births
Living people
Algerian male judoka
Paralympic judoka of Algeria
Paralympic gold medalists for Algeria
Paralympic bronze medalists for Algeria
Paralympic medalists in judo
Judoka at the 2008 Summer Paralympics
Judoka at the 2012 Summer Paralympics
Judoka at the 2016 Summer Paralympics
Medalists at the 2008 Summer Paralympics
Medalists at the 2012 Summer Paralympics
Place of birth missing (living people)
21st-century Algerian people